William H. Koll (August 12, 1923 – September 27, 2003) was an American wrestler and coach.

Biography
Born in Fort Dodge, Iowa in 1923, Koll was a wrestler at Iowa State Teachers College (now the University of Northern Iowa) and later became a wrestling coach, most notably at his alma mater and for the Penn State Nittany Lions wrestling team.  As a wrestler, Koll was undefeated (72–0) and won three straight NCAA Championships (1946–1948), He was twice voted outstanding wrestler at the national tournament, the first wrestler to achieve this honor.  Koll's college career was interrupted by World War II, during which he participated in the Normandy landings and earned a Bronze Star. 

Koll competed for the U.S. at the 1948 Summer Olympics in London and place fifth in the freestyle competition.  As a professor of Health and Physical Education and coach, Koll led Penn State for 14 seasons (1965–1979), which included  unbeaten dual meet campaigns in 1967, 1970, 1971, 1972 and 1974.

Koll is a member of the National Wrestling Hall of Fame and the father of Rob Koll, the head wrestling coach at Stanford University.

Koll died in 2003 in State College, Pennsylvania at the age of 80.

See also
 List of Pennsylvania State University Olympians

References

1923 births
2003 deaths
American male sport wrestlers
Northern Iowa Panthers football coaches
Northern Iowa Panthers wrestlers
Olympic wrestlers of the United States
Penn State Nittany Lions wrestling coaches
Wrestlers at the 1948 Summer Olympics
United States Army personnel of World War II
Sportspeople from Fort Dodge, Iowa